Renato de Monti (born March 3, 1960 in Merano) is an Italian slalom canoeist who competed from the early 1980s to the mid-1990s. He won a bronze medal in the C1 team event at the 1993 ICF Canoe Slalom World Championships in Mezzana.

Monti also competed in two Summer Olympics, earning his best finish of fifth in the C1 event in Barcelona in 1992.

World Cup individual podiums

References

Sports-reference.com profile

1960 births
Canoeists at the 1992 Summer Olympics
Canoeists at the 1996 Summer Olympics
Italian male canoeists
Living people
Olympic canoeists of Italy
Medalists at the ICF Canoe Slalom World Championships
Sportspeople from Merano
20th-century Italian people